Spriggina is a genus of early bilaterian animals whose relationship to living animals is unclear. Fossils of Spriggina are known from the late Ediacaran period in what is now South Australia. Spriggina floundersi is the official fossil emblem of South Australia. It has been found nowhere else. Its bottom was covered with two rows of tough interlocking plates, while one row covered its top; its front few segments fused to form a "head."

Spriggina affinity is currently unknown; it has been variously classified as an annelid worm, a rangeomorph-like frond, a variant of Charniodiscus, a proarticulatan, or an arthropod perhaps related to the trilobites, or even an extinct phylum. Lack of known segmented legs or limbs, and glide reflection instead of symmetric segments, suggest an arthropod classification is unlikely despite some superficial resemblance.

The genus Spriggina may have originally contained 3 different species, although now it has been concluded that there is only one species within the genus. These species are Spriggina floundersi, "Spriggina" ovata and "Spriggina" borealis. Spriggina ovata is now a junior synonym of Marywadea ovata. The latter of the organisms, S. borealis, is still being debated upon whether or not it's part of the genus Spriggina as it differs from S. floundersi.

Description

The organism was segmented, with no fused segments, with the segments sometimes being curved. The upper surface of the organism was covered by one row of overlapping cuticular plates, the underside with paired plates.

The first two segments formed a "head". The front segment had the shape of a horseshoe with a pair of depressions on its upper surface which may represent eyes. The second segment may have borne antennae. Subsequent segments bore annulations.

Some fossils have what may be a circular mouth at the centre of the semicircular head – although interpretation is hampered by the small size of the creature relative to the large grains of sandstones in which it is preserved. Legs are not preserved.

The symmetry observed is not exactly bilaterian, but appears to be a glide reflection, where opposite segments are shifted by half an interval. In some specimens the body segments tilt backwards, making roughly chevron patterns; while in others they are more or less straight. There appear to be fairly complex variations between these two extremes.

Discovery and naming
The genus was named after Reg Sprigg who discovered the fossils of the Ediacara Hills—part of the Flinders Ranges in South Australia—and was a proponent of their recognition as multicellular organisms.
Spriggina floundersi is at present the only generally accepted species in this genus. The specific name "floundersi" refers to amateur South Australian fossil hunter Ben Flounders. Spriggina ovata has now been moved into its own genus, Marywadea.

Spriggina is known only from beds of Ediacaran age.

Spriggina possessed a tough, though uncalcified body, evident from the fossils' preservation: always as a mould in the lower surface of the fossiliferous bed.

Classification

Like many of the Ediacara biota, the relationship of Spriggina to other groups is unclear. It bears some similarity to the living polychaete worm Tomopteris and Amphinomidae, but its lack of chaetae, along with other lines of evidence, suggests that it cannot be placed in this phylum. It was also compared to the rangeomorphs, frondose members of the Ediacara biota that may represent a separate kingdom.
While its glide symmetry may suggest otherwise, Spriggina is considered by some other researchers to be an arthropod; its superficial resemblance to the trilobites may suggest a close relationship to this class. This similarity to trilobites could also be an example of convergent evolution. Spriggina may have been predatory, and may have played a role in initiating the Cambrian transition.

See also

 Yorgia
 Dickinsonia
 List of Ediacaran genera

References

External links
Google Image Search: Spriggina

Sprigginidae
Prehistoric bilaterian genera
†Spriggina
Emblems of South Australia